Jos Loos served as the International Commissioner and General Commissioner of the Luxembourg Boy Scouts Association.
In 1991, Loos was awarded the 216th Bronze Wolf, the only distinction of the World Organization of the Scout Movement, awarded by the World Scout Committee for exceptional services to world Scouting.

References

External links

Recipients of the Bronze Wolf Award
Year of birth missing
Scouting and Guiding in Luxembourg